Kadur Junction railway station, also known as Kaduru Junction railway station (station code: DRU) is an Indian Railways station in Kadur in the Indian state of Karnataka.

Junction
The station is a railway junction in South Western Railway zone of Mysuru Division, between Bangalore, Hubli, Shimoga, Chikkamagaluru and Mangalore. Kadur is well connected with most of the major cities like Shivamogga, Mumbai, Bangalore, Pune, Bellary and Chennai & Chikkamagaluru through regular trains.

References

Railway junction stations in Karnataka
Mysore railway division
Railway stations in Chikkamagaluru district